M. spectabilis may refer to:

Macrocybe spectabilis, a mushroom species
Madhuca spectabilis, a tree species
Malus spectabilis, a crabapple species
Manilkara spectabilis, a tree species
Marumba spectabilis, a moth species
Melaleuca spectabilis, a plant species
Melanophryniscus spectabilis, a toad species
Melica spectabilis, a grass species
Micropholis spectabilis, a flowering plant species
Miltonia spectabilis, an orchid species
Mopalia spectabilis, a mollusc species
Murex spectabilis, a sea snail species
Myelobia spectabilis, a moth species